Green Withins Brook in Lancashire, England, is a small tributary of the River Yarrow that runs from Standing Stones Hill on Anglezarke Moor, to the ruins of Simms.

References

Rivers of Chorley
Rivers of Lancashire
West Pennine Moors
1Green